Alexander James Torr Renton FRHistS (born 5 March 1961) is a British journalist and broadcaster. He is the author of several historical and investigative books including Blood Legacy: reckoning with a family's story of slavery, and Stiff Upper Lip: secrets, crimes and the schooling of a ruling class.

Early life and education
Renton was born in Toronto, Canada, on 5 March 1961, the oldest child of the politician Tim Renton, Baron Renton of Mount Harry and the novelist and historian Alice Blanche Helen Fergusson. He was educated at Ashdown House, East Sussex, Eton College, Brighton College and Exeter University.

Career
As a journalist he has held staff jobs as a reporter and editor on British newspapers The Independent and the London Evening Standard. He has been a columnist for The Times and a Scotland-based correspondent for Newsweek magazine. He has won awards for foreign reporting, investigative journalism and food writing. He worked in Asia for Oxfam from 2001 to 2004. There he began writing about food cultures, poverty and food policy.

Drawing on his own experience at three British residential schools, Renton was presenter and reporter on a 2018 episode of the ITV current affairs programme Exposure titled "Boarding Schools, the Secret Shame". In 2022, he co-wrote (with Caitlin Smith) and presented a BBC Radio 4 series, In Dark Corners,
on abuse and cover-up at some of Britain's elite schools, including Eton College, Fettes College, Gordonstoun and its junior school.

According to The Guardian in July 2022, since realising in 2013 that the teachers who abused him could still be abusing children, Renton started to speak out about the abuse he suffered, and to support other victims with a book, articles, and radio and television programmes. He has said that many prestigious schools go to great lengths to protect their reputation rather than victims. Renton has said that boarding schools are "simply unsafe" until the law on safeguarding in residential institutions for the vulnerable is overhauled, and that his is the first in about seven generations of his family not to send their children to boarding school.

Renton's book Blood Legacy, an account of his ancestors' involvement in the Atlantic slave trade and plantation slavery in the Caribbean, was long-listed for the Baillie Gifford Prize in September 2021.

Selected publications
 13 Foods that shape our world (2022) 
Blood Legacy: reckoning with a family's story of slavery (2021) 
 Stiff Upper Lip: secrets, crimes and the schooling of a ruling class (2017) 
 Planet Carnivore: why cheap meat costs the Earth (2014)

Personal life
Renton married the journalist Ruth Valerie Burnett in 2002. They have a son and daughter.

References

British journalists
Fellows of the Royal Historical Society
Living people
People educated at Ashdown House
British non-fiction writers
People educated at Eton College
1961 births
Sons of life peers